The Nemanjić dynasty is depicted in a family tree composition in several specimen of Byzantine art frescoes in medieval Serbian Orthodox monasteries. The scheme is known as the Nemanjić family tree (loza Nemanjića). Examples include those of Gračanica (1321), Peć (ca. 1335), Visoki Dečani (ca. 1350), and Matejić (ca. 1360).

The Nemanjić family tree is also preserved from engravings, such as those of Studenica (1733), and Hristofor Žefarović (1741).

References

Sources

Byzantine art
Fresco paintings in North Macedonia
Fresco paintings in Kosovo
Serbian art
14th-century paintings
Nemanjić dynasty
14th century in Serbia